SABRE (Security Assurance by the Building Research Establishment) was launched in 2017 by the Building Research Establishment (BRE). Organisations such as RIBA have already acknowledged SABRE as a recognised security approach.

SABRE is a security assurance approach focussed on providing a comprehensive record and rating of a building’s resistance to threats.

It uses similar principles as the well-established sustainability rating system known as BREEAM, also developed by BRE.

Purpose
SABRE has been developed as a trusted third party security assessment and certification process that offers those that design, build and occupy buildings a reliable grading system that captures just how well the buildings will resist threats and also offer a credible way to carry out cost-benefit analyses on security.

Examples of SABRE 
SABRE has already been adopted in significant projects, such as the St Regis Hotel in Astana Kazakhstan.

References

External links
Bre Buzz Blog
BRE SABRE Brochure
SABRE Essentials
The BREEAM scheme
Red Book Live

Building research